Channa Mereya is a 2017 Indian Punjabi-language romance film directed by Pankaj Batra. It is a remake of the Marathi film Sairat (2016). The film follows Kainat (Payal Rajput), a girl from a wealthy family who falls in love with her poor classmate Jagat (Ninja). They start seeing each other secretly, but when their relationship is exposed, they face trouble from Kainat's brother Balli (Amrit Maan) and father (Yograj Singh). The film received mixed reviews from critics.

Cast 
Ninja as Jagat
 Payal Rajput as Kainat
 Amrit Maan as Balli
 Yograj Singh as Kainat's father

Production 
Channa Mereya is an official remake of the 2016 Marathi film Sairat. While remaining largely faithful to the original film, director Pankaj Batra took a few liberties: while the male lead of Sairat had a younger sister, the character was replaced with a younger brother in Channa Mereya. The male lead's friend in Marathi was a farmer, while the remake depicted him as a mechanic. Ninja, a playback singer, made his acting debut with this film, as did lyricist and singer Amrit Maan.

Soundtrack 
The soundtrack was composed by Goldboy.

Release and reception 
Channa Mereya was released on 14 July 2017. The film received mixed reviews from critics, who felt it was a "copy-paste" version of Sairat. Jasmine Singh of Tribune called it a "remake gone wrong", but "things that still make Channa Mereya appreciable are, the fresh pairing of Ninja and Payal Rajput, nice music and praise worthy cinematography". Bobby Sing Mid-Day called Rajput the film's "weakest link", adding, "While the film adeptly highlights the caste and class system prevalent in the society, where it fails is in the presentation of the lead pair."

References

External links 
 

Punjabi-language Indian films
2010s Punjabi-language films
2017 films
2017 romantic drama films
Films directed by Pankaj Batra
Films scored by Jaidev Kumar
Indian romantic drama films
Punjabi remakes of Marathi films